La Santa María de la Inmaculada Concepción (Spanish for: The Holy Mary of the Immaculate Conception), or La Santa María, originally La Gallega, was the largest of the three ships used by Christopher Columbus in his first voyage across the Atlantic Ocean in 1492. Her master and owner was Juan de la Cosa.

History
Santa María was built in Pontevedra, Galicia, in Spain's North-West region. Santa María had a single deck and three small masts.

The other ships of the Columbus expedition were the smaller caravel-type ships Santa Clara; one particular ship sailed for 46 years and was remembered as La Niña ("The Girl"), and La Pinta ("The Painted"). All these ships were second-hand (if not third- or more) and were not intended for exploration. Niña, Pinta, and the Santa María were modest-sized merchant vessels comparable in size to a modern cruising yacht. The exact measurements of length and width of the three ships have not survived, but good estimates of their burden capacity can be judged from contemporary anecdotes written down by one or more of Columbus's crew members, and contemporary Spanish and Portuguese shipwrecks from the late 15th and early 16th centuries which are comparable in size to that of Santa María. These include the ballast piles and keel lengths of the Molasses Reef Wreck and Highborn Cay Wreck in the Bahamas. Santa María, being Columbus' largest ship, was only about this size, and Niña and Pinta were smaller, at only 50 to 75 tons burden and perhaps  on deck (updated dimensional estimates are discussed below in the section entitled Replicas).

Shipwreck
With three masts, Santa María was the slowest of Columbus' vessels but performed well in the Atlantic Ocean crossing. Then on the return trip, on 24 December (1492), not having slept for two days, Columbus decided at 11:00 p.m. to lie down to sleep. The night being calm, the steersman also decided to sleep, leaving only a cabin boy to steer the ship, a practice which the admiral had always strictly forbidden. With the boy at the helm, the currents carried the ship onto a sandbank, running her aground off the present-day site of Cap-Haïtien, Haiti. It sank the next day. Realizing that the ship was beyond repair, Columbus ordered his men to strip the timbers from the ship. The timbers were later used to build a fort which Columbus called La Navidad (Christmas) because the wreck occurred on Christmas Day, north from the modern town of Limonade (see map, and the photograph).

Santa María carried several anchors, possibly six. One of the anchors now rests in the Musée du Panthéon National Haïtien (MUPANAH), in Port-au-Prince, Haiti.

On 13 May 2014, underwater archaeological explorer Barry Clifford claimed that his team had found the wreck of Santa María. In the following October, UNESCO's expert team published their final report, concluding that the wreck could not be Columbus's vessel. Fastenings used in the hull and possible copper sheathing dated it to the 17th or 18th century.

Crew
Columbus' crew was not composed of criminals as is widely believed. Many were experienced seamen from the port of Palos in Andalusia and its surrounding countryside, as well as from the region of Galicia in northwest Spain. It is true, however, that the Spanish sovereigns offered an amnesty to convicts who signed up for the voyage; still, only four men took up the offer: one who had killed a man in a fight, and three friends of his who had then helped him escape from jail.

Despite the romantic legend that the Queen of Spain had used a necklace that she had received from her husband the king as collateral for a loan, the voyage was principally financed by a syndicate of seven noble Genovese bankers resident in Seville (the group was linked to Amerigo Vespucci and funds belonging to Lorenzo di Pier Francesco de Medici). Hence, all the accounting and recording of the voyage was kept in Seville. This also applies to the second voyage, even though the syndicate had by then disbanded.

The crew of Santa María is well-known, albeit in many cases, there are no surnames and the crewman's place of origin was used to differentiate him from others with the same given name.

Crew list
 Cristoforo Colon (Christopher Columbus), captain-general
 Juan de la Cosa, owner and master
 Pedro Alonso Niño, pilot
 Diego de Arana, master-at-arms 
 Pedro de Gutierrez, royal steward
 Rodrigo de Escobedo, secretary of the fleet 
 Rodrigo Sanchez, comptroller 
 Luis de Torres, interpreter 
 Bartolome Garcia, boatswain 
 Chachu, boatswain 
 Cristobal Caro, goldsmith 
 Juan Sanchez, physician 
 Antonio de Cuéllar, carpenter
 Diego Perez, painter 
 Lope, joiner
 Rodrigo de Triana
 Maestre Juan
 Rodrigo de Jerez
 Alonso Chocero
 Alonso Clavijo
 Andres de Yruenes
 Bartolome Biues
 Bartolome de Torres
 James Wardropper (Lord of the Wardrobes)
 Diego Bermudez
 Domingo de Lequeitio
 Gonzalo Franco
 Jacomel Rico
 Juan (Horacio Crassocius from La Rabida Friary)
 Juan de Jerez
 Juan de la Placa
 Juan Martines de Acoque
 Juan de Medina
 Juan de Moguer
 Juan Ruiz de la Pena
 Marin de Urtubia
 Pedro Yzquierdo
 Pedro de Lepe
 Pedro de Salcedo, servant of Columbus and ship's boy
 Rodrigo de Gallego
 Pedro de Terreros, cabin boy  
 Diego García

Replicas

Little is definitively known about the actual dimensions of Santa María, since no documentation or illustration has survived from that era. Since the 19th century, various notable replicas have been publicly commissioned or privately constructed.

Quadricentennial
Interest in reconstructing Santa María started in Spain at around 1890 for the 400th anniversary of Columbus's voyage. An 1892 reconstruction by the Spanish government depicted the ship as a nau.

West Edmonton Mall
A replica was built during Expo 1986 and anchored in "Deep Sea Adventure Lake" at West Edmonton Mall. Built at False Creek in Vancouver, British Columbia, the ship was hand-carved and hand-painted, and then transported by flatbed trucks across the Rocky Mountains to Edmonton, Alberta.

Quincentennial
A replica, depicted as a Carrack, was commissioned by the city of Columbus, Ohio. It was built by the Scarano Brothers Boat Building Company in Albany, New York, who later cut the ship in half and transported it by truck to the Scioto River. The replica cost about 1.2 million dollars. The ship was constructed out of white cedar as opposed to an oak wood used on the original to give the ship a long life in the Scioto River and to reduce cost. The main mast was carved out of a single douglas fir tree and was equipped with a top sail (since removed). The replica was declared by Jose Maria Martinez-Hidalgo, a Spanish marine historian, to be the most authentic replica of the Santa María in the world during the ship's coronation on 12 October 1991.

Dana Rinehart, the 50th mayor of Columbus, christened the ship as part of the 500th anniversary of its voyage. The ship was removed from its moorings in 2014, cut into 10 pieces, and stored in a lot south of the city, pending funding to do repairs and restorations.  As of early 2016, the plans for restoration have stalled. Its parts can be seen via satellite view on Google Maps .

Madeira
A functional replica was built on the island of Madeira, between July 1997 and July 1998, in the fishing village of Câmara de Lobos. In 1998 Santa María represented the Madeira Wine Expo 98 in Lisbon, where she was visited by over 97,000 people in 25 days. Since then thousands more have sailed and continue to sail aboard that Santa María replica which is located in Funchal.

See also

 Columbian Exchange
 Niña
 Pinta
 Pinzón brothers
 Santa María Rupes, a ridge on planet Mercury named after this ship
 Ship replica (including a list of ship replicas)
 Voyages of Christopher Columbus
 Wharf of the Caravels

References 

1492 in the Spanish West Indies
15th-century maritime incidents
Exploration ships
Age of Discovery ships
Christopher Columbus
Spanish West Indies
15th-century ships
Three-masted ships
Carracks
Age of Sail individual ships
December events
Shipwrecks in the Caribbean Sea
Cap-Haïtien
Shipwrecks of Haiti